Ascot Priory is a former priory in Berkshire, England, established in 1861. It was the mother house of the Society of the Most Holy Trinity, a community of nuns within the Anglican Communion. It now serves as a church and spirituality centre.

Aims and activities
The objects are the furtherance of the religious and other charitable purposes of the Church of England, in particular in accordance with the doctrines commonly known as Anglo-Catholic. The buildings at Ascot Priory are available to church and other Christian groups as a retreat house and conference centre. The priory church is also a focus of worship and prayer throughout the year.

Early history
The community was established by Lydia Sellon in 1849 as the Society of the Most Holy Trinity, the second Anglican sisterhood, to minister to the poor in the seafaring community of Devonport, hence their popular name, the Devonport Sisters. The society expanded rapidly, and in the 1850s absorbed London communities, including the first-established, the Sisterhood of the Holy Cross ("Park Village Community").

Current activity
Set in 40 acres of woodland and gardens, the priory is now a centre for retreat and spiritual renewal. The priory aims to be a place where, in silence and peace, God can be encountered, life renewed and hope rekindled.

There is a small regular congregation, and the main service of the week is the 10:00 am Mass in the priory church on Sundays. There is also a daily Mass from Tuesday to Friday most weeks in the Lady Chapel. Attendance at weekday Mass is mostly those attending retreats.

As at January 2022 the Wardenship is vacant following retirement of Revd Paul McLaren-Cook, and regular services have been suspended since the start of the COVID-19 lockdown.

References

External links

Ascot Priory website

Monasteries in Berkshire
Religious organizations established in 1861
1861 establishments in England
19th-century Christian monasteries
Anglican monasteries in the United Kingdom
19th-century churches in the United Kingdom
Winkfield